Sir Richard Leofric Jackson CBE (12 July 1902 – 17 February 1975), known as Joe Jackson, was a British barrister and police officer in the London Metropolitan Police.

Jackson was born in India, the third son of William Jackson, leader of the Calcutta Bar. His mother was the daughter of Sir Thomas Turton, former Advocate-General of Bengal. He was educated at Cheam School and Eton College, where he acquired the nickname "Joe" after a sports writer watching him box in the final of the Public Schools Boxing Championship compared him to heavyweight champion Joe Beckett. He then went on to Trinity College, Cambridge, where he gained a half blue for boxing.

He was called to the bar by the Middle Temple in 1927 and set up a criminal practice. In 1933, however, he joined the Department of the Director of Public Prosecutions as a Professional Legal Clerk. In 1946 he was appointed secretary of the Metropolitan Police Office, ranking with the Assistant Commissioners (although a civilian). In 1949 he spent three months in Malaya as a member of the Police Mission to advise the government on problems stemming from the Malayan Emergency.

In August 1953 he was appointed Assistant Commissioner "C", in charge of the Criminal Investigation Department. He was also British representative to Interpol from 1957, becoming a member of the executive committee in 1958, and president from 1960 to 1963. He was appointed Commander of the Order of the British Empire (CBE) in the 1958 Birthday Honours. In 1962 he edited the fifth English edition of Criminal Investigation, by Hans Gross.

He was knighted in the 1963 Birthday Honours, shortly before his retirement, following which he became a director and joint vice-chairman of Securicor. He also wrote his memoirs Occupied with Crime, which were published in 1967.

Footnotes

References
Obituary, The Times, 18 February 1975
Who Was Who

1902 births
1975 deaths
Police officers from Kolkata
People educated at Cheam School
People educated at Eton College
Alumni of Trinity College, Cambridge
English barristers
Members of the Middle Temple
Civil servants in the Home Office
Members of HM Government Legal Service
Assistant Commissioners of Police of the Metropolis
Knights Bachelor
Commanders of the Order of the British Empire
20th-century British lawyers
People from Kolkata
20th-century English lawyers